Ray Bussard (August 12, 1928 – September 22, 2010) was a hall-of-fame and Olympic swimming coach from the United States. He was inducted into the International Swimming Hall of Fame as an Honor Coach in 1999, and into the American Swimming Coaches Association's Hall of Fame in 2008 He was an assistant coach for the USA's swimming team at the 1984 Summer Olympics.

Bussard coached the men's swimming team at the University of Tennessee for 21 season, from 1968-1989. When he began at the school, Tennessee had not competed in swimming at the NCAA level since 1959. While at Tennessee, he was twice named the NCAA's Swimming Coach of the Year (1972 and 1978), and his Volunteers won the NCAA Swimming Championships in 1978.

Bussard served as a coach for the USA at the: 1984 Olympics, and 1979 and 1983 Pan American Games.

In 2000, Bussard was inducted into the Virginia Sports Hall of Fame.

See also
 List of members of the International Swimming Hall of Fame

References

1928 births
2010 deaths
American swimming coaches
Tennessee Volunteers swimming coaches
People from Hot Springs, Virginia